Brandon Davies (born July 25, 1991) is an American-born naturalized Ugandan professional basketball player for Olimpia Milano of the Italian Lega Basket Serie A (LBA) and the EuroLeague. He also represents the senior Ugandan national team. He was an all-conference college player at Brigham Young University. Davies earned an All-EuroLeague First Team selection in 2019.

Early life and college career
Davies was born in Philadelphia, but adopted by single mother Kathy Davies and raised in Provo, Utah. He attended Provo High School, where his team won state titles in his sophomore and junior seasons.  After considering schools such as California, Gonzaga, and Utah, Davies chose to play college basketball at Brigham Young.

After playing a reserve role as a freshman in 2009–10, Davies became a key player for the Cougars as a sophomore. He served as the key inside player for the small, sharp-shooting 2010–11 Cougars (led by eventual National Player of the Year Jimmer Fredette). BYU raced to a 27–2 record and was ranked no. 3 in the AP Poll when Davies was suspended from the team for violating BYU's honor code by having premarital sex with his girlfriend.

Davies was reinstated to the team as a junior and was named to the All-West Coast Conference team in each of his last two seasons at BYU.  As a senior, Davies served as team captain and averaged 17.7 points and 8.0 rebounds per game.

Professional career
Following his graduation from BYU, Davies was invited to participate in the Portsmouth Invitational Tournament (PIT) pre-NBA draft camp.  Davies performed well, averaging 20.7 points per game on 68% shooting and grabbing 9.3 rebounds per game.  He was named MVP of the PIT.  Davies' performance earned him an invitation to the Chicago NBA Draft combine.  After going undrafted in the 2013 NBA draft, he joined the Los Angeles Clippers for the 2013 NBA Summer League. On September 5, 2013, he signed with the Clippers, but was later waived on October 21.

Philadelphia 76ers (2013–2014)
On October 28, 2013, Davies signed with the Philadelphia 76ers. He played in his first NBA game on November 2, 2013 against the Chicago Bulls, scoring two points in two minutes of action. On January 18, 2014, he fractured his right small finger, requiring surgery and up to a month of rehabilitation.

On November, 5, 2014, Davies scored a career-high 20 points in an 89–91 loss to the Orlando Magic.

Brooklyn Nets (2014–2015)
On December 11, 2014, Davies was traded to the Brooklyn Nets in exchange for Andrei Kirilenko, Jorge Gutiérrez, the Nets' second-round draft pick in 2020, the right to swap second-round picks in 2018, and cash considerations. On January 6, 2015, he was waived by the Nets after appearing in seven games.

Élan Chalon (2015)
On January 12, 2015, Davies signed with Élan Chalon of the LNB Pro League in Chalon-sur-Saône, France for the rest of the 2014–15 LNB Pro A season as a replacement for an injured player. He helped Élan reach the league playoffs.

Pallacanestro Varese (2015–16)
In August 2015, Davies signed with Pallacanestro Varese in Varese, Italy for the 2015–16 season.

AS Monaco (2016–17)
In July 2016, Davies signed with AS Monaco of the LNB Pro A and Basketball Champions League.

Žalgiris Kaunas (2017–2019)
In the summer of 2017, Davies played in The Basketball Tournament on ESPN for Team Fredette. He competed for the $2 million prize, and for Team Fredette, he scored 20 points and grabbed seven rebounds in their first round game, which they lost to Team Utah (Utah Alumni) 100–97.

On June 23, 2017, Davies signed with a 1+1 contract with Lithuanian team Žalgiris Kaunas of the Lithuanian Basketball League. Over his two seasons with Žalgiris, Davies helped the team achieve much success, in particular in the EuroLeague. On May 9, 2019, Davies was named to the All-EuroLeague First Team, becoming the first Žalgiris player to win the award in 15 years since Arvydas Sabonis in 2004.

FC Barcelona (2019–2022)
On July 4, 2019, Davies signed a two-year deal with the Spanish club Barcelona. In his second game with Barcelona, Davies recorded 24 points and 11 rebounds in a 95–87 win over Saski Baskonia.

Olimpia Milano (2022–present)
On June 24, 2022, Davies signed a two-year contract with Italian champions Olimpia Milano of the Lega Basket Serie A, playing also the EuroLeague.

National team career
Coinciding with his move to Barcelona, Davies acquired a Ugandan passport, because under the Cotonou Agreement African players are not subject to the same limited quotas in the Liga ACB as American players. As part of the arrangement, Barcelona agreed to release Davies to play some matches for the Uganda national team, and in November 2021 he played in three 2023 World Cup qualifiers in Benguela. (The Turkey team complained that Barcelona had not released Sertaç Şanlı for its qualifiers in Europe.)

Career statistics

Professional

|-
| style="text-align:left;"|
| style="text-align:left;"|Philadelphia
| NBA
| 51 || 11.3 || .422 || .200 || .642 || 2.1 || .5 || .5 || .2 || 2.8
|-
| style="text-align:left;"|
| style="text-align:left;"|Philadelphia/Brooklyn
| NBA
| 27 || 15.7 || .402 || .235 || .649 || 3.1 || 1.1 || .7 || .3 || 5.3
|-
|-class=sortbottom
| align="center" colspan=2 | Career
| NBA
| 78 || 12.8 || .411 || .227 || .644 || 2.5 || .7 || .5 || .2 || 3.7
|-
| style="text-align:left;"|2017–18
| style="text-align:left" |Žalgiris Kaunas
| Lithuanian League
| 45 || 16.6 || .616 || .000 || .762 || 5.2 || 1.6 || .9 || .6 || 11.3
|-
| style="text-align:left;"|2017–18
| style="text-align:left" |Žalgiris Kaunas
| EuroLeague
| 36 || 17.4 || .577 || .000 || .848 || 3.5 || .9 || .9 || .4 || 9.3 
|-
| style="text-align:left;"|2018–19
| style="text-align:left" |Žalgiris Kaunas
| EuroLeague
| 34 || 23.7 || .559 || .000 || .762 || 5.5 || 2.0 || 1.0 || .4 || 14.2 
|-
| style="text-align:left;"|2019–20
| style="text-align:left" |FC Barcelona
| Spanish League
| 26 || 18.0 || .545 || .409 || .768 || 4.5 || 1.0 || .9 || .5 || 11.7
|-
|-class=sortbottom
| align="center" colspan=2 | Career
| All Leagues
| 219 || 16.6 || .543 || .284 || .761 || 3.9 || 1.2 || .8 || .4 || 8.7

Personal life
Davies is a member of the Church of Jesus Christ of Latter-day Saints. He married Lenzie Quist of Riverside, California, in January 2015. They have a daughter, born in the summer of 2016.

References

External links

 BYU Cougars bio 
 EuroLeague profile
 Liga ACB profile
 

1991 births
Living people
African-American basketball players
African-American Latter Day Saints
American adoptees
American expatriate basketball people in France
American expatriate basketball people in Italy
American expatriate basketball people in Lithuania
American expatriate basketball people in Monaco
American expatriate basketball people in Spain
American men's basketball players
AS Monaco Basket players
Basketball players from Philadelphia
Basketball players from Utah
BC Žalgiris players
Brooklyn Nets players
BYU Cougars men's basketball players
Centers (basketball)
College basketball controversies in the United States
Élan Chalon players
FC Barcelona Bàsquet players
Latter Day Saints from Pennsylvania
Latter Day Saints from Utah
Liga ACB players
Pallacanestro Varese players
Philadelphia 76ers players
Sportspeople from Provo, Utah
Ugandan men's basketball players
Undrafted National Basketball Association players